Mount Twomey is a somewhat detached peak (over 1,200 in.) situated on the northwest margin of the Morozumi Range, 2.5 nautical miles (4.6 km) northwest of Berg Peak. Mapped by United States Geological Survey (USGS) from surveys and U.S. Navy air photos, 1960–63. Named by Advisory Committee on Antarctic Names (US-ACAN) for Arthur A. Twomey, United States Antarctic Research Program (USARP) geologist at McMurdo Station, 1967–68 and 1968–69.

Mountains of Victoria Land
Pennell Coast